San Sebastián de Garabandal (commonly called just  Garabandal), is a rural village in the Peña Sagra mountain range of Northern Spain. Located in the autonomous community of Cantabria, about 600 meters above sea level, Garabandal is about 35 miles (55 km) from the Cantabrian capital, Santander, and roughly 250 miles (400 km) from the Spanish capital, Madrid. It has a population of about 300.

Garabandal Events

From 1961 to 1965, four young schoolgirls – Mari Loli Mazón, Jacinta Gonzalez, Mari Cruz Gonzalez and Conchita Gonzalez – said they had received several apparitions and messages from Saint Michael the Archangel and the Blessed Virgin Mary under the title of Our Lady of Mount Carmel. The apparitions numbered in the thousands, drew huge crowds, and featured supposed paranormal phenomena, much of it filmed or photographed, with thousands of witnesses.

Today, the town is a place of pilgrimage for Roman Catholics and members of other faiths. Catholics have since been reminded by the Roman Hierarchy that the Garabandal apparitions are in no way sanctioned or approved by the Church. However, the pilgrimages are now allowed by the local bishop.

Because of the town's remote location and lack of easy accessibility, it has remained largely the same as it was in 1961.

See also
 Garabandal apparitions

References

Sources
 EWTN on Garabandal 
 Workers of Our Lady of Garabandal

External links

 The apparitions of Our Lady of Mount Carmel de Garabandal
 Garabandal: Only God Knows – The 2018 Movie
 Workers of Our Lady of Mount Carmel de Garabandal – Official Web site of the Workers of Our Lady of Mount Carmel. The organization was founded by Joey Lomangino in Lindenhurst, New York (1968).
 Pilgrimage to Garabandal – Web site of the Workers of Our Lady of Mount Carmel in Australia.
 St. Joseph Publications, a non profit foundation, was incorporated in 1973 to foster devotion to Saint Joseph and the Virgin Mary and make known  messages given through apparitions. Books and videos of Our Lady’s apparitions, especially Garabandal and Fátima, are available on this site free for download.
 Garabandal Videos – Video Clips of the apparitions, with the letters from Bishop José Viliplana of Santander and Cardinal Seper.
 Garabandal Apostolate – Website in English about Garabandal apparitions. Official website of Garabandal Apostolate

Populated places in Cantabria
Towns in Spain
Catholic pilgrimage sites